William Brooks, 2nd Baron Crawshaw DL (16 October 1853 – 19 January 1929) was a British peer. He was the eldest son of Thomas Brooks, 1st Baron Crawshaw and married  Mary Ethel Hicks-Beach (1853 -1 October 1914) on 12 October 1882 daughter of Sir Michael Hicks Hicks Beach, 8th Baronet (1809–1854).

Coat of arms

Notes

Deputy Lieutenants of Lancashire
1853 births
1929 deaths
British people of English descent
20th-century British landowners
People from Long Whatton
William Brooks, 2nd Baron Crawshaw